George MacLean may refer to:
 George Edwin MacLean, president of the University of Iowa
 George Ian MacLean, gold commissioner of Yukon

See also
 George Maclean, governor of Gold Coast
 Sir George Maclean (commissary general), British Army officer